Craig Roberts (June 6, 1968 – September 12, 2006) was a male wrestler from Canada, who was born in Everett, Washington (United States). He represented Canada at the 1996 Summer Olympics in Atlanta, Georgia. Roberts won a silver medal at the 1995 Pan American Games, and won the 1991 68 kg Commonwealth title.

References
 sports-reference

1968 births
2006 deaths
Wrestlers at the 1996 Summer Olympics
Canadian male sport wrestlers
Olympic wrestlers of Canada
Sportspeople from Everett, Washington
Pan American Games silver medalists for Canada
Pan American Games medalists in wrestling
Wrestlers at the 1995 Pan American Games
Medalists at the 1995 Pan American Games